Leptacme  may refer to:
 Leptacme (moth), a moth genus in the family Geometridae
 Leptacme (gastropod), a snail genus in the family Clausiliidae